is a Japanese professional footballer who plays as a goalkeeper for J1 League club Sanfrecce Hiroshima.

Club statistics
.

Honours

Club
Sanfrecce Hiroshima
 J.League Cup: 2022

References

External links
Profile at Sanfrecce Hiroshima

1991 births
Living people
Association football people from Ibaraki Prefecture
Japanese footballers
J1 League players
J2 League players
Kashiwa Reysol players
FC Gifu players
Tokushima Vortis players
Albirex Niigata players
Vegalta Sendai players
Sanfrecce Hiroshima players
Association football goalkeepers